Alderman Rowe Nicholas Lesmond (born 7 July 1978) is an American Virgin Islander sportsman who has played both cricket and soccer for his country. He was born in Saint Lucia.

A wicket-keeper and left-handed batsman, Lesmond made his first-class cricket debut for the Leeward Islands against Jamaica in the 2005–06 Carib Beer Cup. He made three further first-class appearances for the team, the last of which came against Barbados in the same season. In his four first-class matches, he scored 38 runs at an average of 7.60, with a high score of 13 not out. He also played List A cricket for the Leeward Islands, making his debut in that format against Jamaica in the 2005–06 KFC Cup. He made five further List A appearances for the team, the last of which came against Guyana in the same tournament. In six List A appearances, he scored 11 with a high score of 10 not out.

In February 2006, Lesmond played for the United States Virgin Islands in the 2006 Stanford 20/20, whose matches held official Twenty20 status. He made two appearances in the tournament, in a preliminary round victory against Sint Maarten and in a first-round defeat against St Vincent and the Grenadines. He later played for the United States Virgin Islands in their second appearance in the Stanford 20/20 in 2008, making two appearances in a preliminary round victory against St Kitts and in a first-round defeat against Antigua and Barbuda. In his four appearances, he scored a total of 26 runs at an average of 6.50 and a high score of 14. Behind the stumps he took three catches and made two stumping.

Lesmond has also played for the United States Virgin Islands soccer team, as well as club soccer for the Helenites. He made his international soccer debut in a 19 June 2011 friendly match against Anguilla. Lesmond scored a goal in the U.S. Virgin Islands' 2014 World Cup Qualification win against the British Virgin Islands in July 2011. It was the team's first win in thirteen years.

References

External links
 

1978 births
Living people
Leeward Islands cricketers
United States Virgin Islands cricketers
United States Virgin Islands soccer players
United States Virgin Islands international soccer players
Helenites players
Saint Lucian emigrants to the United States Virgin Islands
Saint Lucian cricketers
People from Micoud Quarter
Association football forwards
Wicket-keepers